This is a list of fossiliferous stratigraphic units in Belarus.



List of fossiliferous stratigraphic units

See also 
 Lists of fossiliferous stratigraphic units in Europe
 List of fossiliferous stratigraphic units in Latvia
 List of fossiliferous stratigraphic units in Lithuania
 List of fossiliferous stratigraphic units in Poland
 List of fossiliferous stratigraphic units in Russia
 List of fossiliferous stratigraphic units in Ukraine

References

Further reading 
 
 
 
 

 Belarus
 
 
Fossiliferous stratigraphic units